Michelangelo Tonti (1566–1622) was a Roman Catholic cardinal.

Biography
On 16 Nov 1608, he was consecrated bishop by Fabio Biondi, Titular Patriarch of Jerusalem, with Metello Bichi, Bishop Emeritus of Sovana, and Giambattista Leni, Bishop of Mileto, serving as co-consecrators.

Episcopal succession

References

1566 births
1622 deaths
17th-century Italian cardinals